Insight Films is a British film and television company, founded by Debbie Shuter and Adam Tysoe in 1995.

Filmography

Short films 
As well as feature films, Insight Films have also produced several documentaries:

 Head on the block, Documentary/Educational
 Educating Haji, Documentary
 St Lukes, Documentary
 Tough Going, Documentary
 The Final Puff, Documentary
 Beigels Already, Documentary
 Emotional Literacy, Educational

References 

Film production companies of the United Kingdom